El club de los insomnes or El refugio de los insomnes is a 2018 Mexican drama film directed and written by José Eduardo Giordano, and Sergio Goyri Jr. The film premiered on 15 June 2018, and stars Alejandra Ambrosi, Cassandra Ciangherotti, and Leonardo Ortizgris. The plot revolves around a friendship between a man suffering from insomnia, an aspiring photographer and a woman who is not sure about her pregnancy. They meet every night in a mini-mart. The film was available for streaming in worldwide on Netflix on 30 November 2018.

Cast 
 Alejandra Ambrosi as Estela
 Cassandra Ciangherotti as Danny
 Leonardo Ortizgris as Santiago
 Fernando Becerril as Gutiérrez
 Humberto Busto as Compañero
 Alexandra de la Mora as Andrea
 Mónica Dionne as Alejandra
 Fernando Luján as Hombre Lobo
 Marco Méndez as El Diablo
 Luis Rosales as Carlos

References

External links 
 
 

2018 films
Mexican drama films
Spanish-language Netflix original films